Divine Discontent is the fourth studio album by American band Sixpence None the Richer, released on October 29, 2002.

Background 
Lead singer Leigh Nash has described her understanding of the album title as being that "sometimes your pain and the bad things you go through in life can be good if they bring you to a better place, a stronger place in your life," that is, "discontent can be divine." The album's completion and release was delayed due to a protracted struggle with their prior record label which Nash has described as being a low point for her, but that the process had made her emotionally stronger. In press notes, lead songwriter Matt Slocum said that there is "spiritual content" in many of his songs which come from "trying to be honest about the issues of life," while adding that "it also comes more in the form of asking questions than giving answers."

The cover of Crowded House's "Don't Dream It's Over" was one of the later songs to be selected for the album, as it was a request by the label. However, the band was an admirer of Neil Finn and so did not mind.

Nash and Slocum parted ways in early 2004 before reuniting to record the My Dear Machine EP in 2008.

Track listing

Personnel 
Sixpence None the Richer

 Leigh Nash – vocals
 Matt Slocum – acoustic guitar, cello, electric guitar, keyboard, vibraphone, e-bow
 Justin Cary – bass guitar
 Sean Kelly – acoustic guitar, electric guitar, hi-string guitar
 Dale Baker – percussion, drums
 Jerry Dale McFadden – piano, Hammond organ, mellotron
 Rob Mitchell – drums, percussion

Additional personnel

 Bob Becker – viola
 Denyse Buffum – viola
 Monisa Phillips Angel – viola
 Evan Wilson – viola
 Bruce Dukov – concert master, violin
 Suzie Katayama – cello
 Anthony LaMarchina – cello
 Carl Rabinowitz – cello
 John Catchings – cello
 Larry Corbett – cello
 Dan Smith – cello
 Rudy Stein – cello
 Mario de Leon – violin
 Peter Kent – violin
 David Davidson – violin
 Pamela Sixfin – violin
 Bob Peterson – violin
 Jacob Lawson – violin
 Rachel Purkin – violin
 Brian Leonard – violin
 Joel Derouin – violin
 Eve Butler – violin
 John Wittenberg – violin
 Jamie Muhoberac – keyboards
 Van Dyke Parks – leader
 Tim Pierce – guitar
 Rick Todd – french horn
 Kris Wilkinson – leader, viola

Production

 Paul Fox – producer (1–3, 5–13)
 Matt Slocum – producer (1–3, 5–13)
 Rob Cavallo – producer (4)
 Marc Chevalier – recording (1–3, 5–13), string recording (7, 12)
 Jeff Tomei – Pro Tools  editing (1–3, 5–13), recording (2, 3, 5, 13), string recording (6, 11)
 Allen Sides – recording (4)
 Jenny Knotts – additional recording (1–3, 5–13), recording assistant (1–3, 5–13)
 Eric Bickle – recording assistant (2, 3, 5, 13)
 Greg Fogie – recording assistant (2, 3, 5, 13)
 Brian Vibberts – recording assistant (4)
 Bill Appleberry – Pro Tools editing (1–3, 5–13)
 Luke Wooten – Pro Tools editing (1–3, 5–13)
 Doug McKean – Pro Tools engineer (4)
 Louie Teran – digital editing (1–3, 5–13)
 Stewart Whitmore – digital editing (1–3, 5–13)
 Tom Lord-Alge – mixing
 Femio Hernández – mix assistant
 Stephen Marcussen – mastering (1–3, 5–13)
 Robert Vosgien – mastering (4)
 Cheryl Jenets – production coordinator (4)
 Paul McMenamin – art direction
 Darren Waterston – paintings
 Matthew Welch – photography

Awards 

 2003 Dove Award for Modern rock/alternative recorded song: Sixpence None the Richer, "Breathe Your Name"

Charts 
Album - Billboard (United States)

Singles - Billboard (United States)

References 

2002 albums
Sixpence None the Richer albums
Albums produced by Rob Cavallo
Albums produced by Paul Fox (record producer)
Albums produced by Ron Aniello